108 Aquarii (abbreviated 108 Aqr) is a star in the equatorial constellation of Aquarius. 108 Aquarii is the Flamsteed designation, although it also bears the Bayer designation i3 Aquarii and the variable star designation ET Aquarii. It has an apparent visual magnitude of 5.194 and can be seen with the naked eye under suitably dark skies.

This is an Ap star; meaning it has a peculiar spectrum that shows an overabundance of certain elements. It has more than three times the mass of the Sun and is 2.5 times the Sun's radius. 108 Aquarii is radiating 132 times the luminosity of the Sun from its outer atmosphere at an effective temperature of 12,274 K. At this heat, the star has the white hue of an A-type star.

References

External links
 Image ET Aquarii

Aquarius (constellation)
Alpha2 Canum Venaticorum variables
Aquarii, i3
Aquarii, 108
Aquarii, ET
223640
117629
9031
Durchmusterung objects
Ap stars
A-type main-sequence stars